Park Hyun-su (born 29 December 1995) is a South Korean rower. In 2018, he won the gold medal in the men's lightweight single sculls event at the 2018 Asian Games held in Indonesia.

He also competed at the World Rowing Championships in 2017 and in 2019.

References 

Living people
1995 births
Place of birth missing (living people)
South Korean male rowers
Asian Games medalists in rowing
Rowers at the 2018 Asian Games
Asian Games gold medalists for South Korea
Medalists at the 2018 Asian Games
20th-century South Korean people
21st-century South Korean people